Resident Evil 2 is a 2019 survival horror game developed and published by Capcom. A remake of the 1998 game Resident Evil 2, it was released for PlayStation 4, Windows, and Xbox One in January 2019 and for Amazon Luna, PlayStation 5 and Xbox Series X/S in June 2022, and a Nintendo Switch cloud version released in November 2022. Players control rookie police officer Leon S. Kennedy and college student Claire Redfield as they attempt to escape Raccoon City during a viral outbreak that transforms the citizens into zombies and other creatures.

Capcom first considered remaking Resident Evil 2 following the release of the remake of the first Resident Evil in 2002, but was delayed as series creator Shinji Mikami did not want to divert development from the then-upcoming Resident Evil 4 (2005). Capcom announced the Resident Evil 2 remake in August 2015 and released the first trailer and gameplay footage at E3 2018.

Resident Evil 2 received praise for its presentation, gameplay, and faithfulness to the original. It received numerous awards, including winning Ultimate Game of the Year at the 2019 Golden Joystick Awards. It has sold over 11.20 million copies as of January 2023, outselling the original Resident Evil 2. It was followed by remakes of Resident Evil 3 in 2020 and Resident Evil 4 in 2023.

Gameplay
Resident Evil 2 is a remake of the 1998 game Resident Evil 2 for PlayStation. Unlike the original, which uses tank controls and fixed camera angles, the remake features "over-the-shoulder" third-person shooter gameplay similar to Resident Evil 4 and more recent games in the series that allows players the option to move while using their weapons similar to Resident Evil 6.

The assisted and standard difficulty modes deviate from the original by featuring autosaves and allowing players to save as often as they would like inside safe rooms. If the player chooses to play on "Hardcore" difficulty, players will be required to collect and use a finite number of ink ribbons to save the game's progress, much like in the original game.

While exploring the police station, players can find and pick up items that can help them survive and escape. Certain items such as herbs and gun powder can be combined to make healing items and ammunition respectively. Items can also be inspected for clues gaining access to certain areas or items hidden throughout the game and can be discarded after use.

Overall combat varies depending on difficulty. Assisted difficulty allows aim assist and health recovery along with weaker enemies while hardcore difficulty has stronger enemies and has scarce ammo for players to find. Combat will also vary depending on who players are fighting. Enemies will generally come after players after they are spotted and can be killed or crippled to slow them down. Zombies will attempt to break into the station through windows but can be stopped if the windows are boarded up beforehand. Certain enemies must be fought to progress through the game and cannot be avoided.

Although Leon and Claire will both start with handguns at the beginning of their scenarios, each has different weapons that can be obtained throughout the game. Weapons can also be customized by finding and equipping gun parts that will improve their performance. Sub weapons like knives and grenades can also be found and equipped and used to attack and fend off enemies that grab onto the player. When standing still, weapon accuracy increases and the crosshair tightens, rewarding the player for playing in a style similar to earlier entries. 

At certain points in each scenario, players will encounter the Tyrant, a  Bio-Organic Weapon (B.O.W.) sent by Umbrella to eliminate all survivors in the police station and will attempt to kill the player when encountered. The Tyrant cannot be killed, although weapons can stun or slow him down. While players can evade the Tyrant, he will constantly search throughout the station except for safe rooms and certain areas of the police station.

As with the 1998 game, the remake of Resident Evil 2 offers the option to play through the main campaign as either Leon S. Kennedy, a rookie police officer on his first day, or Claire Redfield, a college student and sister of original protagonist Chris. Depending on the player's choice, the main story will be experienced with variations in subplots, accessible areas, obtainable items, weapons, and the final boss battle. Also like the original, both campaigns feature a supporting character who becomes playable for one section of the game. Players control the mysterious Ada Wong in Leon's story, whose segment involves hacking electronic devices, and young girl Sherry Birkin in Claire's story, whose segment centers around stealth.

Similar to the "Scenario B" feature of the original game, beating the main campaign for the first time unlocks the option to play through a "2nd Run" as the other protagonist. 2nd Run is a variation of the main campaign that adds additional content to frame the second playthrough as occurring concurrently with the first playthrough. For example, the protagonist in 2nd Run will enter the police station from a different entrance and find several doors already unlocked by the protagonist from the first playthrough. Completing 2nd Run is also required to experience the true ending of the main campaign. Selecting the "New Game" scenario for the selected character allows players to start with the default item loadout with items they had playing the game for the first time.

The remake brings back "The 4th Survivor" and "The Tofu Survivor" minigames present in the 1998 original, which are unlocked after completing the 2nd Run mode. "The 4th Survivor" follows Umbrella Corporation operative Hunk and requires players to travel from the sewers to the outside of the police department while facing a large number of enemies. "The Tofu Survivor" features the same scenario, but replaces Hunk with an anthropomorphic tofu armed only with knives. The remake's version of "The Tofu Survivor" also adds the unlockable characters Konjac, Uirō-Mochi, Flan, and Annin Tofu, who all have a unique item loadout.

Plot 
On the night of September 29, 1998 two months after the events of Resident Evil, rookie police officer Leon S. Kennedy makes his way toward Raccoon City to start his first shift at the police department.  At a gas station on the city outskirts, he meets Claire Redfield who is looking for her missing brother.  The gas station is overrun by zombies, as well as the rest of Raccoon City after a strain of the T-virus was carried into the city water supply.  The two reach the Raccoon City Police Department but are separated when a truck driver crashes his vehicle. Depending on the player character, either Leon or Claire finds that the police department is also overrun with zombies after being briefly rescued by Marvin Branagh.  Marvin hands the player character a notebook from another deceased officer, which holds information about a secret passage out of the police department.  Branagh, infected, later turns into a zombie. The player character eventually finds the underground passage but is attacked by mutated Umbrella Corporation leading scientist William Birkin but defeats him.

Inside the parking garage, Leon is attacked by zombie dogs but is saved by Ada Wong.  Ada claims to be an FBI agent sent to retrieve the "G-virus", the virus responsible for mutating Birkin which he developed with his wife and coworker Annette.  She hopes to retrieve a sample of the G-virus to incriminate Umbrella. Claire finds paperwork confirming her brother had left Raccoon City weeks prior to investigate Umbrella elsewhere, and eventually she runs into Sherry— a young girl and the daughter of William.  

Leon discovers reporter Ben Bertolucci in the holding cells, imprisoned by corrupt Police Chief and serial killer Brian Irons for investigating Umbrella.  As Ben tries to convince Leon to release him, he is killed by the Tyrant— a monster created by the T-virus.  Leon attempts to leave the police station, but is attacked by the Tyrant and saved again by Ada.  They discover gun salesman Robert Kendo and his infected daughter Emma inside his gun shop across the street, and Leon pledges to help Ada retrieve the G-virus sample to prove Umbrella's corruption.  Leon and Ada meet Annette in the sewers before she forces them to pursue her to the underground Umbrella lab NEST, unwilling to give up the G-virus sample.  The two kiss as they descend to NEST.

Sherry is kidnapped by Chief Irons, who has been covering up Umbrella's activities,  but William arrives and injects Irons with a "G-embryo".  Claire reaches the orphanage where Irons is keeping Sherry, but the embryo births from Irons's stomach and kills him.  Claire is knocked unconscious by William as they flee into the sewers and she is separated from Sherry. William infects Sherry— certain her body will not reject the G-virus and will allow it to replicate.

Finding Sherry and descending further underground into NEST, Claire finds the G-virus vaccine and Annette administers it to her daughter.  Leon finds the G-virus sample but runs into Annette again.  Annette outs Ada as a mercenary selling the sample to the highest bidder before she is mortally wounded by William. Ada demands the sample from Leon at gunpoint, but is knocked off into the abyss below the facility along with the sample and Leon is unable to save her.  Annette dies and as the NEST facility is set to self-destruct, Leon is attacked by the Tyrant, now a mutated and deadlier "Super Tyrant".  Ada, seemingly surviving her fall, tosses Leon an RPG and he kills the Tyrant.  Claire staves off a further mutated William before the trio reunites on a train out of the facility.  William attacks the train once more in a final mutated form, but the train is decoupled and William is destroyed in the lab's destruction.  The next morning Leon, Claire, and Sherry emerge far outside the confines of Raccoon City and into safety.  Leon and Claire vow to continue their fight against the Umbrella Corporation.

Development 

The original Resident Evil 2 was released for the PlayStation in 1998. Following the release of the 2002 remake of the first Resident Evil for the GameCube, Capcom considered a similar remake of Resident Evil 2, but series creator Shinji Mikami did not want to divert development away from Resident Evil 4. In August 2015, producer Yoshiaki Hirabayashi announced in a video that the remake had been approved and was in active development, ending the video with the phrase "We Do It". No further details were released until Sony's E3 2018 press conference, when Capcom released the debut trailer and gameplay footage and removed "Remake" from the title. Hideki Kamiya, director of the original Resident Evil 2, said that he had pushed Capcom to create a remake for years. Hirabayashi said the team was striving to capture the spirit of the original game, and that the team incorporated feedback received about Resident Evil 6, a game he also produced.

To meet modern expectations, the team altered some character designs to better match the more photorealistic setting; for example, Leon no longer wears large shoulder pads, which were added to distinguish his original, low-polygon model. Ada's red dress was dropped in favor of a trenchcoat with sunglasses for similar reasons. Though they strove to make a "modern, accessible" game, they focused on horror over action, hoping to preserve a claustrophobic feel. The game uses the RE Engine, the same game engine used for Resident Evil 7: Biohazard (2017), which allowed Capcom to modernize the gameplay. Producer Tsuyoshi Kanda acknowledged the difficulty of making zombies seem scary and threatening, as they had become ubiquitous in entertainment media since the release of the original Resident Evil in 1996. By removing the fixed camera angles, the team had to use different ways to conceal enemies, using elements such as room layout, lighting, and smoke. The new camera system also affected the sound design, as it no longer made sense for sound to come from a fixed source. The faces of several character models are based on scans of real people. Leon S. Kennedy is based on the model Eduard Badaluta, Claire Redfield is based on the model Jordan McEwen, and Marvin Branagh is based on the music producer Patrick Levar.

The game features a Dolby Atmos soundtrack. Due to Capcom's decision to use non-union voice actors, the original game's actors did not reprise their roles.

Release
Resident Evil 2 was released on PlayStation 4, Windows, and Xbox One worldwide on January 25, 2019. The game supports enhancements on the PlayStation 4 Pro and Xbox One X, offering either 4K resolution or 60 frames per second. A demo known as the 1-Shot Demo was released on January 11, 2019. It ends after 30 minutes and does not allow repeat playthroughs, however the same demo was later rereleased as the "R.P.D. Demo" and does allow repeat playthroughs. A collector's edition was made available for the console versions, featuring extras such as a Leon S. Kennedy figurine, a hardcover art book, a R.P.D. renovation poster, and a digital soundtrack.
 
On December 12, 2019, a final update was introduced to the Resident Evil 2 remake where the protagonist of Resident Evil 3, Jill Valentine has written a letter to Kendo. This letter can be found at Kendo's Gunshop right after Leon S. Kennedy and Ada Wong leave the police station. Reading this letter also unlocks an achievement called "Chasing Jill".

Versions for PlayStation 5 and Xbox Series X/S were announced on March 2, 2022, and released on June 13, 2022 alongside upgrades for Resident Evil 7: Biohazard (2017) and Resident Evil 3 (2020). These versions include visual enhancements including ray-tracing and high-framerate modes, and the PlayStation 5 version supports haptic feedback and adaptive triggers. Owners of the game on PlayStation 4 and Xbox One are able to upgrade for free, and a free upgrade patch for the Windows version was also released simultaneously. A version for Amazon Luna was announced on May 26, 2022, and was subsequently released on June 9, 2022. A Nintendo Switch cloud version was released on November 11, 2022.

Downloadable content 
A downloadable content pack, The Ghost Survivors, was released on February 15, 2019, and features four missions: "No Time to Mourn", "Runaway", "Forgotten Soldier" and "No Way Out". The mode centers around the characters Robert Kendo, Katherine Warren, Ghost, and Sheriff Daniel Cortini, who all die in the main story, and depicts alternate scenarios where they survive. "No Time to Mourn", "Runaway", and "Forgotten Soldier" require the player to reach a destination as they make their way through enemies, while "No Way Out", which is unlocked after completing the other three missions, requires the player to defeat a wave of a hundred zombies inside a gas station.

Reception

Following its E3 2018 showing, Resident Evil 2 won the "Best of Show" award at the 2018 Game Critics Awards. The 1-Shot Demo received over 4.7million downloads worldwide.

Resident Evil 2 received "universal acclaim" for the PlayStation 4 and Xbox One versions, and "generally favorable reviews" for the Windows version from critics, according to review aggregator Metacritic.

Ben Reeves of Game Informer wrote that "Resident Evil 2 not only looks great, it plays well, and it forces you into a series of dark encounters that are a total rush." Keith Stuart of The Guardian wrote that it was "a reminder of how beautifully crafted survival horror games were in their heyday." The Daily Telegraphs Tom Hoggins described the game as a "thrilling return to the legacy of the 1998 original".

IGNs Daemon Hatfield originally gave the game an 8.8 in their review, only to increase it to a 9.0 after being made aware of the unlockable second playthrough that presents the story from another point of view. They stated in their review that "Capcom did a fantastic job of resurrecting all the best parts of the classic Resident Evil 2 and making it look, sound, and play like a 2019 game."

Chris Carter of Destructoid called the game "A hallmark of excellence. There may be flaws, but they are negligible and won't cause massive damage." Aoife Wilson of Eurogamer described it as "a masterly reimagining of a modern classic". Polygons Michael McWhertor wrote that Resident Evil 2 showcases "the very best of survival horror"; similar praise was expressed by Heather Alexandra of Kotaku, who wrote that the game "provides some of the best moments in the franchise". Alessandro Fillari of GameSpot said that with Resident Evil 2 "the classic survival horror franchise embraces its past in a new, exciting way".

Sales
The game shipped threemillion copies worldwide in its first week of sales, rising to four million within a month with over one million on PC. It became Capcom's second biggest launch on Steam after Monster Hunter: World from 2018. Resident Evil 2 debuted at number two on the Japanese charts with 252,848 retail sales, after Kingdom Hearts III. As of March, the game was still among the top 20 best selling video games in Japan with more than 352,000 sold copies. Resident Evil 2 also topped the UK charts, becoming Capcom's biggest UK launch since Resident Evil 7: Biohazard (2017) in physical retail sales, and was the UK's best-selling game in January 2019, despite being available for only two days. By December 2019, the game had sold over 5.8 million copies, overtaking the sales of the original Resident Evil 2. It had sold over 7.8 million copies by December 2020 and 9.3 million copies by December 2021. By July 2022, the game had sold over 10 million copies.

Awards

Notes

References

External links 

 
 

2019 video games
Bioterrorism in fiction
Cannibalism in fiction
Capcom games
Censored video games
Cloud-based Nintendo Switch games
2010s horror video games
Mutants in fiction
Nintendo Switch games
PlayStation 4 games
PlayStation 4 Pro enhanced games
PlayStation 5 games
Resident Evil games
Science fiction video games
Single-player video games
Survival video games
Video game remakes
Video games about police officers
Video games about viral outbreaks
Video games about zombies
Video games developed in Japan
Video games featuring female protagonists
Video games set in 1998
Video games set in the United States
Windows games
Xbox One games
Xbox One X enhanced games
Xbox Series X and Series S games
Golden Joystick Award for Game of the Year winners